Kachess Lake is a lake and reservoir along the course of the Kachess River in Washington state, US. The upper part of the lake, north of a narrows, is called Little Kachess Lake. The Kachess River flows into the lake from the north, and out from the south. Kachess Lake is the middle of the three large lakes which straddle Interstate 90 north of the Yakima River in the Cascade Range. The other two are Cle Elum Lake, the easternmost which is also north of I-90 and Keechelus Lake, the westernmost, which is south of I-90.

Kachess Lake is part of the Columbia River basin, the Kachess River being a tributary of the Yakima River, which is tributary to the Columbia River.

The lake is used as a storage reservoir for the Yakima Project, an irrigation project run by the United States Bureau of Reclamation. Although a natural lake, Kachess Lake's capacity and discharge is controlled by Kachess Dam, a 115-foot (35 m) high earthfill structure built in 1912. The discharge channel for Kachess Reservoir is 2,877 feet long and was constructed from the natural lake to the intake structure of the dam’s outlet works, approximately 1800 feet downstream and at a lower elevation than the original lake outlet. The intent of the lowered outlet works was to put all of the average annual runoff into service by adding an additional 76,000 acre feet of natural lake water.

The name Kachess comes from a Native American term meaning "more fish", in contrast to Keechelus Lake, whose name means "few fish".

See also
Baker Lake (Alpine Lakes Wilderness)

References

External links
Kachess Dam, United States Bureau of Reclamation
, USGS, GNIS
Historic American Engineering Record (HAER) documentation, filed under Easton, Kittitas County, WA:

Reservoirs in Washington (state)
Historic American Engineering Record in Washington (state)
Lakes of Kittitas County, Washington
Buildings and structures in Kittitas County, Washington
Protected areas of Kittitas County, Washington
Wenatchee National Forest
Dams in Washington (state)
United States Bureau of Reclamation dams
Dams completed in 1912
1912 establishments in Washington (state)
Tributaries of the Yakima River